William Alfred Young (4 April 1863 – 1 July 1911) served as President of the Council, and Magistrate of the British Overseas Territory of Pitcairn Island three times, between 1897 and 1908. Young was the son of Simon Young and the younger brother of Benjamin Stanley Young, both had held the office before him. Young married Mercy Amelia Lawrence Young, the daughter of Moses Young who had held the office of Magistrate multiple times.

References

1863 births
1911 deaths
Pitcairn Islands people of English descent
Pitcairn Islands people of Saint Kitts and Nevis descent
Pitcairn Islands politicians
Pitcairn Islands people of Polynesian descent
Pitcairn Islands people of Manx descent